Antônio Vilas-Boas (1934–1991) was a Brazilian farmer (later a lawyer) who claimed to have been abducted by extraterrestrials in 1957. Though similar stories had circulated for years beforehand, Vilas-Boas' claims were among the first alien abduction stories to receive wide attention. Some skeptics today consider the abduction story to be little more than a hoax, although Boas nonetheless reportedly stuck to his account throughout his life.

Vilas-Boas' story
At the time of his alleged abduction, Antônio Vilas-Boas was a 23-year-old Brazilian farmer who was working at night to avoid the hot temperatures of the day. On October 16, 1957, he was ploughing fields near São Francisco de Sales when he saw what he described as a "red star" in the night sky. According to his story, this "star" approached his position, growing in size until it became recognizable as a roughly circular or egg-shaped aerial craft, with a red light at its front and a rotating cupola on top. The craft began descending to land in the field, extending three "legs" as it did so. At that point, Boas decided to run from the scene.

According to Boas, he first attempted to leave the scene on his tractor, but when its lights and engine died after traveling only a short distance, he decided to continue on foot. However, he was seized by a  humanoid, who was wearing grey coveralls and a helmet. Its eyes were small and blue, and instead of speech it made noises like barks or yelps. Three similar beings then joined the first in subduing Boas, and they dragged him inside their craft.

Once inside the craft, Boas said that he was stripped of his clothes and covered from head-to-toe with a strange gel. He was then led into a large semicircular room, through a doorway that had strange red symbols written over it. (Boas claimed that he was able to memorize these symbols and later reproduced them for investigators.) In this room the beings took samples of Boas' blood from his chin. After this he was then taken to a third room and left alone for around half an hour. During this time, some kind of gas was pumped into the room, which made Boas become violently ill.

Shortly after this, Boas claimed that he was joined in the room by another humanoid. This one, however, was female, very attractive, and naked. She was the same height as the other beings he had encountered, with a small, pointed chin and large, blue catlike eyes. The hair on her head was long and white (somewhat like platinum blonde) but her underarm and pubic hair were bright red. Boas said he was strongly attracted to the woman, and the two had sexual intercourse. During this act, Boas noted that the female did not kiss him but instead nipped him on the chin.

When it was all over, the female smiled at Boas, rubbing her belly and gestured upwards. Boas took this to mean that she was going to raise their child in space. The female seemed relieved that their "task" was over, and Boas himself said that he felt angered by the situation, because he felt as though he had been little more than "a good stallion" for the humanoids.

Boas said that he was then given back his clothing and taken on a tour of the ship by the humanoids. During this tour he said that he attempted to take a clock-like device as proof of his encounter, but was caught by the humanoids and prevented from doing so. He was then escorted off the ship and watched as it took off, glowing brightly. When Boas returned home, he discovered that four hours had passed.

He later became a lawyer, married and had four children. He stuck to the story of his alleged abduction for his entire life. Though some sources say he died in 1992, he died on January 17, 1991.

Investigation
Following this alleged event, Boas claimed to have suffered from nausea and weakness, as well as headaches and lesions on the skin which appeared without any kind of light bruising. Eventually, he contacted journalist José Martins, who had placed an ad in a newspaper looking for people who had had experiences with UFOs. Upon hearing Boas' story, Martins contacted Olavo Fontes of the National School of Medicine of Brazil; Fontes was also in contact with the American UFO research group APRO. Fontes examined the farmer and concluded that he had been exposed to a large dose of radiation from some source and was now suffering from mild radiation sickness. Writer Terry Melanson states:

Among [Boas's] symptoms were 'pains throughout the body, nausea, headaches, loss of appetite, ceaselessly burning sensations in the eyes, cutaneous lesions at the slightest of light bruising...which went on appearing for months, looking like small reddish nodules, harder than the skin around them and protuberant, painful when touched, each with a small central orifice yielding a yellowish thin waterish discharge.' The skin surrounding the wounds presented 'a hyperchromatic violet-tinged area.'

According to Researcher Peter Rogerson, the story first came to light in February, 1958, and the earliest definite print reference to Boas' story was from the April–June 1962 issue of the Brazilian UFO periodical SBESDV Bulletin. Rogerson notes that the story had definitely circulated between 1958 and 1962, and was probably recorded in print, but that details are uncertain.

Boas was able to recall every detail of his purported experience without the need for hypnotic regression. Further, Boas' experience occurred in 1957, which was still several years before the famous Hill abduction which made the concept of alien abduction famous and opened the door to many other reports of similar experiences.

Researcher Peter Rogerson, however, doubts the veracity of Boas' story. He notes that several months before Boas first related his claims, a similar story was printed in the November 1957 issue of the periodical O Cruzeiro, and suggests that Boas borrowed details of this earlier account, along with elements of the contactee stories of George Adamski. Rogerson also argues:

One reason why the [Boas] story gained credibility was the prejudiced assumption that any farmer in the Brazilian interior had to be an illiterate peasant who 'couldn't make this up'. As Eddie Bullard pointed out to me, the fact that the Vilas-Boas family possessed a tractor put them well above the peasant class ... We now know that AVB was a determinedly upwardly mobile young man, studying a correspondence course and eventually becoming a lawyer (at which news the ufologists who had considered him too much the rural simpleton to have made the story up now argued that he was too respectable and bourgeois to have done so).

Notes

See also
 Barney and Betty Hill
 List of reported UFO sightings
 UFO sightings in Brazil
 UFO

References

1934 births
1991 deaths
Alien abduction reports
1957 in Brazil
Brazilian farmers
20th-century Brazilian lawyers
People from São Paulo (state)
UFO sightings in Brazil